Los Hinojosos is a municipality in located in the province of Cuenca, Castile-La Mancha, Spain. It has a population of 902 (2014).

References

External links

Municipalities in the Province of Cuenca